Paola María Elena Maltese Mongelos, known professionally as Paola Maltese (born 10 January 1984) is Paraguayan actress, presenter and entrepreneur. Born in Asunción, she attended the Scuola Italiana Dante Alighieri  and majored in audio visual communication. As a teenager she appeared in the TV series Gonzalez vs. Bonetti, and she later landed a role in La Chuchi. On stage, she appeared in productions Sorpresas, Cinderella (La cenicienta) and Beauty and the Beast (La bella y la bestia).

Maltese is one of the presenters of the morning show Marca Latina, and a leading presenter for Radio Latina. In 2010 she featured in the film Universo Servilleta.
Currently she is the host of MasterChef Paraguay.

References

Paraguayan stage actresses
Paraguayan television actresses
1984 births
Living people
People from Asunción
Paraguayan radio presenters
Paraguayan people of Italian descent
21st-century Paraguayan actresses
Paraguayan women radio presenters